John Holles, Duke of Newcastle-upon-Tyne, KG, PC (9 January 1662 – 15 July 1711) was an English peer.

Early life
Holles was born in Edwinstowe, Nottinghamshire, the son of the 3rd Earl of Clare and his wife Grace Pierrepont. Grace was a daughter of The Hon. William Pierrepont and granddaughter of the 1st Earl of Kingston-upon-Hull.

Politics
Holles was elected MP for Nottinghamshire as Lord Houghton on 14 January 1689, but was called to the House of Lords two days later when his father died and he became the 4th Earl of Clare. He was created the Duke of Newcastle-upon-Tyne, of the 2nd creation, in 1694. The Duke of Newcastle-upon-Tyne is a title which was created three times in British history. The first creation had become extinct when his father-in-law Henry Cavendish, 2nd Duke of Newcastle-upon-Tyne, died without a male heir. On 30 May 1698, he was appointed Knight of the Order of the Garter.

Family
On 1 March 1690, Holles married his first cousin, Lady Margaret Cavendish, a daughter of Henry Cavendish. They had one child, Lady Henrietta Cavendish Holles (1694–1755), who married the 2nd Earl of Oxford and Mortimer and was mother to Margaret Bentinck, Duchess of Portland.

In 1710 he purchased Wimpole Park in Cambridgeshire and the Manor of Marylebone. The Marylebone lands passed to his son-in-law Harley who named Holles Street in his memory.

A rivalry was formed between John and his sister, Elizabeth, when she married Christopher Vane, 1st Baron Barnard.

Death

The duke died in 1711 from injuries received in a fall from his horse while hunting near Welbeck. He left his Cavendish estates to his son-in-law, Edward Harley (later 2nd Earl of Oxford and Earl Mortimer) and the remainder of his property to his nephew Thomas Pelham, subsequently 1st Duke of Newcastle (third creation) and prime minister. He was buried on 9 August 1711 in St. John's Chapel in Westminster Abbey. A large monument to Holles stands in the north transept of the abbey. Designed by James Gibbs and carved by Francis Bird with the aid of John Michael Rysbrack, it consists of a reclining figure of Holles flanked by statues representing Wisdom and Sincerity.

Records
Correspondence and estate records of John Holles, including letters to his wife, are held at the department of Manuscripts and Special Collections, The University of Nottingham, principally in the Holles Papers (Pw 2), part of the Portland (Welbeck) Collection.

References

External links

Biography of John Holles, Duke of Newcastle-upon-Tyne, with links to online catalogues, on the website of Manuscripts and Special Collections, The University of Nottingham

|-

|-

|-

|-

1662 births
1711 deaths
Burials at Westminster Abbey
Deaths by horse-riding accident in England
21
Earls of Clare
English MPs 1689–1690
Garter Knights appointed by William III
Hunting accident deaths
Lord-Lieutenants of Middlesex
Lord-Lieutenants of Nottinghamshire
Lord-Lieutenants of the East Riding of Yorkshire
Lord-Lieutenants of the North Riding of Yorkshire
Marylebone
People from Edwinstowe